Tell Jezireh is an archaeological site 6km south southwest of Bar Elias in the Beqaa Mohafazat (Governorate). It dates at least to the Bronze Age.

References

Baalbek District
Neolithic settlements
Archaeological sites in Lebanon
Great Rift Valley